Bab Al-Sharqi is a neighborhood of central Baghdad, Iraq. The area surrounding Bab Al-Sharqi market is a stronghold of the Mahdi Army, the main Shia militia in central Iraq..

Background

This Shi'a neighborhood saw some of the most intense sectarian fighting during Operation Iraqi Freedom. It continued to be plagued by routine attacks as late as 2016.

Bab al-Sharqi is located on the east bank of the Tigris River, near the Jumhuriya Bridge. It is directly across the river from the Ministry of Planning, Ministry of Information and the Green Zone.

22 January 2007 Car Bombs

On 22 January 2007 two powerful car bombs ripped through the Bab Al-Sharqi market in Baghdad, killing at least 88 people and wounding 160 others in one of the bloodiest insurgent attacks of Operation Iraqi Freedom. The attack coincided with the arrival of 3,200 additional troops into Baghdad as part of the troop surge of 2007.

Only three months after the devastating attack, Senator Lindsey Graham complained that the media was not giving the American people "the full picture of what's going on here." Though he mostly stayed within the heavily secured Green Zone, and traveled outside the Green Zone only with a heavily armed military escort, he unabashedly told reporters of the "signs of success" he witnessed on his visit to Bab al-Sharqi:

30 January 2015

19 people were killed and 28 wounded when two bombs went off in Baghdad's Bab al-Sharqi district.

21 January 2021 Twin Suicide Bombing(s)
Suicide bombs rock busy Baghdad market, killing at least 32 and 100 wounded in the attack.

References

Neighborhoods in Baghdad